New Taipei City Constituency III  includes most of Sanchong in New Taipei City. The district was formerly known as Taipei County Constituency III (2008-2010) and acquired its present boundaries in 2008, when all local constituencies of the Legislative Yuan were reorganized to become single-member districts.

Current district
 Sanchong: 3 sub-districts
 Dongqu: 12 urban villages
 Yongsheng, Yongji, Yong'an, Yonfeng, Xiwei, Fulong, Wuchang, Wufu, Renzhong, Cihua, Fule, Wushun
 Xiqu: 22 urban villages
 Guotian, Jintian, Sanmin, Tian'an, Tianxin, Tianzhong, Futian, Erchong, Bo'ai, Dayou, Guangtian, Guangyang, Zhongming, Fuzhi, Fude, Fumin, Chenggong, Dehou, Guwang, Wugu, Dingkan, Zhongxing
 Nanqu: 21 urban villages
 Cailiao, Guangming, Guangzheng, Yongchun, Zhongzheng, Jili, Datong, Zhongmin, Pinghe, Da'an, Tong'an, Tongqing, Zhongxiao, Rende, Renyi, Guangrong, Guanghui, Fuxing, Fuli, Qinghe, Yongxing
 Beiqu: 24 urban villages
 Chongyang, Zhongshan, Guolong, Dayuan, Minsheng, Ziqiang, Zheng'an, Zhengyi, Zhengde, Chongxin, Wenhua, Zhongyang, Shuangyuan, Jintong, Jin'an, Guanghua, Chang'an, Changsheng, Dade, Kaiyuan, Zhangyuan, Changjiang, Zhangtai, Zhangfu
 Zhongqu: 26 urban villages
 Jinjiang, Longbin, Chengde, Shunde, Wanshou, Jieshou, Yishou, Xiujiang, Longmen, Ruide, Chongde, Shangde, Weide, Houde, San'an, Anqing, Fu'an, Xin'an, Xingfu, Liuhe, Lide, Liufu, Peide, Yongde, Yonghui, Yongfa

Legislators

Election results

 
 
 
 
 
 
 
 
 
 
 
 
 
 
 

2008 establishments in Taiwan
Constituencies in New Taipei